Cymatosira is a genus of diatoms in the family Cymatosiraceae. It is the type genus of its family.

Species 
 Cymatosira belgica Grunow, 1881
 Cymatosira elliptica Salah, 1955
 Cymatosira gibberula Cheng & Gao, 1993
 Cymatosira lorenziana Grunow, 1862
 Cymatosira capensis Giffen, 1975
 Cymatosira acremonica Schrader, 1969
 Cymatosira adaroi Azpeitia Moros, 1911
 Cymatosira andersonii Hanna, 1932
 Cymatosira biharensis Pantocsek, 1889
 Cymatosira biharensis Pantocsek, 1889
 Cymatosira compacta Schrader & Fenner, 1976
 Cymatosira cornuta Schrader & Fenner, 1976
 Cymatosira coronata Fenner & Schrader in Schrader & Fenner, 1976
 Cymatosira curvata Cleve-Euler, 1949
 Cymatosira debyi Tempère & Brun in Brun & Tempère, 1889
 Cymatosira fossilis Schrader in Schrader & Fenner, 1976
 Cymatosira immunis (Lohman) Abbott in Abbott & Ernissee, 1983
 Cymatosira japonica Tempère & Brun in Brun & Tempère, 1889
 Cymatosira magna Lohman, 1974
 Cymatosira miocaenica Hajós, 1973
 Cymatosira miocaenica Hajós, 1977
 Cymatosira palpebraforma M.P. Olney in Olney et al., 2007
 Cymatosira praecompacta Fenner & Schrader in Schrader & Fenner, 1976
 Cymatosira robusta Schrader & Fenner, 1976
 Cymatosira savtchenkoi Proschkina-Lavrenko, 1960

 Names brought to synonymy
 Cymatosira laevis Heiden, 1928 accepted as Synedropsis laevis (Heiden) G.R.Hasle, L.K.Medlin & E.E.Syvertsen, 1994
 Cymatosira minutissima K.Sabbe & K.Muylaert, 2010 accepted as Cymatosirella minutissima'' (Sabbe & Muylaert) P.Dabek, Witkowski & Sabbe, 2013

References

External links 

 
 Cymatosira at WorMS

Coscinodiscophyceae genera
Cymatosirales